The 1999 World Rowing Championships were World Rowing Championships that were held from 22 to 29 August 1999 at the Royal Canadian Henley Rowing Course in St. Catharines, Ontario, Canada.

Medal summary

Men's events

Women's events

Medal table

References

World Rowing Championships
World Rowing Championships, 1999
W
Rowing Championships
Rowing competitions in Canada
World Rowing Championships
World Rowing Championships